Andrew Allen may refer to:

Andrew Allen (ice hockey) (born 1976), Canadian ice hockey goaltender coach
Andrew Allen (Pennsylvania politician) (1740–1825), lawyer and official from the Province of Pennsylvania
Andrew Allen (New Zealand politician) (1876–1963), New Zealand businessman and politician, mayor of Dunedin and member of the Legislative Council
Andrew Hussey Allen (1855–1921), American archivist and author
Andrew M. Allen (born 1955), American astronaut
Andrew Allen (singer) (born 1981), Canadian singer
Andrew Allen (priest) (died 1808), Irish Anglican priest
Andrew J. Allen (born 1986), American saxophonist and pedagogue
Andrew James Campbell Allen (1856–1923), Northern Irish mathematician and educational administrator
Murder of Andrew Allen (1988–2012), Irish murder victim

Andy Allen may refer to:
Andy Allen (chef) (born 1988), Australian television cook and winner of MasterChef Australia 2012
Andy Allen (footballer) (born 1974), former English footballer
Andy Allen (rugby union) (born 1967), former Welsh international rugby union player
Andy Allen (politician) (born 1988), Ulster Unionist Party politician in Northern Ireland

See also
Andrew Allan (disambiguation)
Allen (surname)